The Frederick City Police Department (FPD) is a law enforcement organization that provides police services to the city of Frederick, Maryland, the second-largest city in that state.  The department is organized into several divisions, and is responsible for policing more than 68,000 people in a land area of 22.9 square miles.  FPD is headed by Edward Hargis, who was appointed Chief of Police in July 2015, replacing outgoing Chief Thomas Ledwell who resigned in September 2014.

History
In 1745, Daniel Dulany, a lawyer and land developer, founded "Frederick town" on a feeder creek of the Monocacy River. Frederick became incorporated in 1817 and had a population of 3,640. Four town constables were appointed that year to provide security on the streets and enforce animal laws.

The Police Department was created in 1858. At that time, there was a captain and two constables. The department staff eventually increased the following years and quickly followed other major cities' models. During the later stages of the American Civil War, the city jail served as the basis for a "contraband camp" for displaced Black people.

Organization 
The department has 144 sworn officers and about forty civilians in several divisions. Its headquarters are located just outside the Frederick County courthouse on West Patrick Street. Like many law enforcement agencies across the country, community policing is an important part of its core services provided to the citizens of Frederick.

FPD also has an auxiliary unit composed of uniformed volunteer officers to supplement regular officers. Auxiliary officers perform essential support duties and assist sworn police officers in their daily activities as well as during special events.

The FPD consists of several divisions, including:

 Criminal Investigations Division
 Patrol Division 1
 Patrol Division 2
 Professional Services Division
 Special Operations Division
 Support Services Division
 Technology and Services Division

Training
FPD has its own police academy, certified by the Maryland Training Police Commission. The department trains not only its own officers, but also cadets from surrounding jurisdictions including the Frederick County Sheriff's Office, the Washington County Sheriff's Office and the Brunswick Police Department. Additionally, the academy periodically trains prospects for the auxiliary police force.

Misconduct

In October 2010, Officer Megan Mattingly resigned after it was alleged that she had lied under oath in court.

In March 2012, Officer Robert Pierce was arrested after he crashed his patrol car into a guardrail. He was believed to have been driving under the influence when he lost control of the car on U.S. 15 at Jefferson Street, and was off duty at the time. He was sentenced to 2 years of unsupervised probation and 48 hours of community service.

In June 2012, Frederick Police Corporal Martin Holt, who was an assistant supervisor of the midnight shift, was charged with assaulting his live-in girlfriend by hitting her several times in the chest and once in the back, according to the Frederick Police Department. He was sentenced to Probation before Judgement.

In October 2013, Officer Charity Faith Hoxie agreed to resign from the department and "not work in law enforcement for three years." This was part of a deal that suspended charges against her for using stolen gift cards in nearby Hagerstown.

In April 2014, Officer Benjamin Whitmore pleaded guilty to charges of assaulting his girlfriend, who was also a Frederick City Police Officer. He was sentenced to Probation Before Judgement, with 18 months of supervised probation. He ran into trouble again in February 2015 when he was taken into custody by Washington County deputies after a brief chase in Hagerstown. He was reportedly intoxicated.
"Frederick officer pleads guilty to assaulting girlfriend".

In June 2015, Officer Deborah Kidwell was arrested in the Boonsboro area by Washington County deputies after a vehicle accident. She was charged with DUI offense.  She was sentenced to Probation Before Judgement.
Frederick Police officer charged with DUI.

See also

 List of law enforcement agencies in Maryland

References

External links

The Frederick Police Department (FPD) at The City of Frederick, MD, official website.

Frederick, Maryland
Municipal police departments of Maryland